Ashutosh Dutta is a computer scientist, engineer, academic, author, and an IEEE leader. He is currently a Senior Scientist, 5G Chief Strategist at Johns Hopkins University Applied Physics Lab, JHU/APL Sabbatical Fellow, Adjunct Faculty and ECE Chair for EP at Johns Hopkins University. He is the Chair of IEEE Industry Connection O-RAN Initiative and Co-Chair for IEEE Future Networks Initiative.

Dutta has co-authored over 150 articles, three book chapters, and 31 patents awarded. As a computer science expert, he has been affiliated with Internet Real-Time Lab (IRT), and Distributed Computing & Communications (DCC) Laboratory of Columbia University, and works on wireless networking, LTE networks, Software Defined Networking (SDN), computer communication, Network Function Virtualization (NFV), 5G, Network Security, and mobility management. He is also the co-author of a book entitled Mobility Protocols and Handover Optimization: Design, Evaluation and Application that has also been translated to Chinese language.

Dutta is a Fellow of Institute of Electrical and Electronics Engineers (IEEE), a Distinguished Member of Association for Computing Machinery (ACM), and has several other leadership positions in these organizations. He also serves as Editor-in-chief for Journal of Cyber Security and Mobility, Associate Technical Editor for IEEE Communications Magazine, and Associate Guest Editor for IEEE IOT Journal.

Education
After receiving a B.S. degree in Electrical Engineering from National Institute of Technology, Rourkela, India, Dutta immigrated to the United States, earning an M.S. in Computer Science from New Jersey Institute of Technology, and his M.Phil. and Ph.D. Degree in Electrical Engineering from Columbia University, New York. He completed his Ph.D. thesis titled Systems Optimization for Mobility Management under the supervision of Henning Schulzrinne.

Career
Dutta started his career as a Computer Engineer at Tata Engineering and Locomotive Company, India, in 1985, and worked there till 1987. He then held about 8 years of appointment as a Director of IT Operations at Columbia University Computer Science Department, before joining Telcordia Technologies Applied Research in 1997 as a Senior Scientist, where he directed research and development initiatives of VolP and wireless technologies till 2010. During his tenure at Telcordia Technologies, he served as Principal Investigator for KDDI’s IMS project to design and build IMS/MMD network for next-generation networks, and also collaborated with ITSUMO QoS team involved in performance analysis of voice and data traffic in an 802.11b networking environment. As Co-PI, he supervised all operational phases of CERDEC project, and Toyota’s mobile content delivery network in all IP wireless environment.

From 2010 till 2013, Dutta worked with NIKSUN Inc. as CTO Wireless and Executive Director of NIKSUN Innovation Center & Quality Assurance, and then held appointment as PMTS/LMTS/Director of AT&T Labs, Middletown, New Jersey till 2018. Since 2015 to n2018, he also held a joint appointment as a Faculty at New Jersey Institute of Technology. Following these appointments, he was briefly associated with College of Staten Island at City University of New York as Adjunct Faculty in Electrical Engineering and Computer Science Department before joining Johns Hopkins University Applied Physics Lab (JHU/APL) as Chief 5G Strategist, Lawrence R. Hafstad Sabbatical Fellow, Adjunct Faculty and ECE Chair for EP. In 2019, he worked for Johns Hopkins University/APL EP Program, and also became the faculty of Johns Hopkins University Information Security Institute, Baltimore, Maryland. Since July 2020, he has been serving as the program chair for Electrical and Computer Engineering for Engineering for Professionals. Currently, he serves as Co-Chair of Service Oriented Network for Global ICT Standardization for India (GISFI), and Co-Director of CTIF-USA, which is an Industry-Academic Collaboration.

At IEEE, Dutta has been serving as a founding Co-Chair for the IEEE Future Networks Initiative since 2016,  and as a Member-At-Large for IEEE Communications Society since 2020. He has also served as IEEE Distinguished Lecturer for IEEE Communications Society till 2020, the Director of Industry Outreach for IEEE Communications Society till 2019, and the general Co-Chair for the IEEE STEM conference for the last 12 years. Dutta has been selected as ACM Distinguished Member in 2021. He also became ACM Distinguished Speaker in 2020, and Chair for ACM Baltimore Chapter in 2021.

Research
Dutta's work is focused in computer communication, LTE networks, Software Defined Networking (SDN), wireless networking, Network Function Virtualization (NFV), 5G, and mobility management.

Mobility management
In his study regarding mobility management, Dutta primarily focused session initiation protocol (SIP) based mobility in IPv6, highlighted the role of IPv6 Linux implementation in terms of delaying node movement, and explored how it affects the performance of real-time applications. He also studied Intra-Domain Mobility Management Protocol (IDMP) in the context of 4th generation (4G) mobile network, and presented a paging scheme under IDMP that has the ability to replicate the current cellular paging structure. Furthermore, he discussed mechanisms to incorporate paging support in IDMP and reduced the mobility-related signaling load on a mobile node. In 2002, he published a paper based on the significance of flexible multi-media, and its role in making Internet Radio and TV networks more attractive for the roaming users. He further proposed a streaming network called MarconiNet based on standard IETF protocols such as SAP, SIP and SDP for signaling, RTP/RTCP for media delivery and feedback control and RTSP for stream control. He is also the one to introduce methods and systems regarding generalized mobility solution using a dynamic tunneling agent.

Wireless networking
Dutta invented a patent and presented "system and method for receiving over a network a broadcast from a broadcast source". He also discovered method for network discovery of a mobile device to use at least one of a plurality of access networks within an IP network. In 2003, he conducted an experimental study to evaluate wireless local area network (WLAN) voice performance and capacity, and offered a practical investigation into the ability of 802.11b MAC layer in terms of supporting simultaneous voice and data. While focusing his study on the media independent handover, he discussed how the IEEE 802.21 standard framework and services are addressing the challenges of seamless mobility for multi-interface devices.

Awards and honors
2000 - Recognition award for serving as a Publicity Co-Chair, Mobicom
Several Recognition awards from the Vice-President of Telcordia Research Labs
2005 - Leadership Award, IEEE-PCJ Section
6 times recipient of DARPA Merit Award for Technical Excellence for Integrated Mobility Management in the Air-Borne Communication Node project
2000 & 2002 - CEO awards, Telcordia Technologies
2009 - MGA Leadership Award, IEEE 
2010 - Professional Leadership Award, IEEE-USA  
2011 - Regional Leadership Award, IEEE-USA
2011 - IEEE Region 1 award for outstanding section leadership for Princeton/Central Jersey Section
2013 - Security Team Award, AT&T Chief Security Office (CSO)  
2016 - 2020 - Distinguished Lecturer, IEEE Communications Society
2020 – 2022 - Distinguished Speaker, ACM
2020 - Distinguished Alumnus Award, NIT Rourkela
2021 - ACM Distinguished Member
2022 - IEEE North American Region Exceptional Service Award
2022 - IEEE USA George F. McClure Citation of Honor

Bibliography

Books
Mobility Protocols and Handover Optimization: Design, Evaluation and Application (2014) ISBN 9780470740583

Selected articles
A. Dutta and E. Hammad, "5G Security Challenges and Opportunities: A System Approach," 2020 IEEE 3rd 5G World Forum (5GWF), 2020, pp. 109-114, doi: 10.1109/5GWF49715.2020.9221122.
R. Pepito and A. Dutta, "Open Source 5G Security Testbed for Edge Computing," 2021 IEEE 4th 5G World Forum (5GWF), 2021, pp. 388-393, doi: 10.1109/5GWF52925.2021.00075.
A. Dutta, B. Lyles and H. Schulzrinne, "A formal approach to mobility modeling," 2011 Third International Conference on Communication Systems and Networks (COMSNETS 2011), 2011, pp. 1–10, doi: 10.1109/COMSNETS.2011.5716488.
Misra, A., Das, S., Dutta, A., McAuley, A., & Das, S. K. (2002). IDMP-based fast handoffs and paging in IP-based 4G mobile networks. IEEE Communications Magazine, 40(3), 138-145.
Nakajima, N., Dutta, A., Das, S., & Schulzrinne, H. (2003, May). Handoff delay analysis and measurement for SIP based mobility in IPv6. In IEEE International Conference on Communications, 2003. ICC'03. (Vol. 2, pp. 1085–1089). IEEE.
Das, S., Misra, A., McAuley, A., Dutta, A., Agrawal, P., & Das, S. (2006). U.S. Patent No. 6,992,994. Washington, DC: U.S. Patent and Trademark Office.
Baba, S., Chen, J. C., Dutta, A., Shobatake, Y., & Vakil, F. (2007). U.S. Patent No. 7,184,418. Washington, DC: U.S. Patent and Trademark Office.
Dutta, A., Schulzrinne, H., & Yemini, Y. (2007). U.S. Patent No. 7,296,091. Washington, DC: U.S. Patent and Trademark Office.
Dutta, A., Famolari, D., Das, S., Ohba, Y., Fajardo, V., Taniuchi, K., ... & Schulzrinne, H. (2008). Media-independent pre-authentication supporting secure interdomain handover optimization. IEEE Wireless Communications, 15(2), 55-64.
Taniuchi, K., Ohba, Y., Fajardo, V., Das, S., Tauil, M., Cheng, Y. H., ... & Famolari, D. (2009). IEEE 802.21: Media independent handover: Features, applicability, and realization. IEEE Communications Magazine, 47(1), 112-120.
Taniuchi, K., Ohba, Y., Madhani, S., Das, S., & Dutta, A. (2014). U.S. Patent No. 8,717,931. Washington, DC: U.S. Patent and Trademark Office.

References 

Living people
American people of Indian descent
Fellow Members of the IEEE
National Institute of Technology, Rourkela
New Jersey Institute of Technology alumni
Columbia School of Engineering and Applied Science alumni
Year of birth missing (living people)